Pedro, the Angel of Olvera Street is a 1946 picture book written and illustrated by Leo Politi. The story is about Pedro's participation in a posada. The book was a recipient of a 1947 Caldecott Honor for its illustrations.

References

1946 children's books
American picture books
Caldecott Honor-winning works
Charles Scribner's Sons books